SAI International School  is a CBSE cum IGCSE affiliated, day-cum boarding, co-educational school in Bhubaneswar, Odisha. It was founded by Late Dr. Bijaya Kumar Sahoo in 2008, and is affiliated to the Central Board of Secondary Education, New Delhi.

The school received the D. L. Shah National Quality Gold Award by the Quality Council of India, and was ranked 1st in the Education World India School Rankings 2020-21 . It was again ranked 1st second year in a row in the EducationWorld India School Ranking 2021–22. SAI International was included by Fortune India in the list of "Future 50 Schools Shaping Success". It was also awarded the International School Award in the "exemplary" category by the British Council for its achievements.

SAI Angan, the play school of the SAI International School, with a total area of 1,50,000 square feet caters to 1500 students in the age group of 2 to 7 years. SAI Angan was granted the International School Award (ISA) 2018-21 by the British Council on Wednesday, December 5, 2018.

References

External links
 Official website

Schools in Bhubaneswar
2008 establishments in Orissa
International schools in India